The Invisible Wall is a 1947 American film noir directed by Eugene Forde starring Don Castle, Virginia Christine and Richard Gaines.

The movie features an early performance by Jeff Chandler as a gangster.

Plot
Told in flashback, the film recounts how gambler Harry Lane (Castle) ended up accused of murder: Returned from the war he took up his old job working for bookmaker Marty Floyd (Keane). Dispatched by his boss to deliver $20,000 to a contact in Las Vegas, he foolishly loses some of the money at the gambling tables, then loses the rest of it to a conman (Gaines). His attempts to recover the money result in him accidentally killing the conman. In the end Lane is cleared when it is revealed that the victim was no victim after all.

Cast
 Don Castle as Harry Lane
 Virginia Christine as Mildred Elsworth
 Richard Gaines as Richard Elsworth
 Arthur Space as Roy Hanford
 Edward Keane as Marty Floyd
 Jeff Chandler as Al Conway
 Mary Gordon as Mrs. Bledsoe
 Harry Cheshire as Eugene Hamilton
 Rita Duncan as Alice Jamison
 Harry Shannon as Det. Capt. R.W. Davis
 Earle S. Dewey as Doctor Winters

References

External links
 
 
 

1947 films
1947 crime drama films
American crime drama films
American black-and-white films
1940s English-language films
Film noir
20th Century Fox films
Films directed by Eugene Forde
Films produced by Sol M. Wurtzel
1940s American films